Gordon George Riddick (6 November 1943 – 24 August 2018) was an English professional footballer who made over 400 appearances as a midfielder in the Football League for Gillingham, Brentford, Luton Town, Charlton Athletic, Northampton Town and Orient. While with Brentford, a persistent ankle injury forced Riddick to retire from football in September 1976, but he re-joined the club on a non-contract basis the following month and made 17 further appearances before leaving again in February 1977. In addition to football, Riddock played Minor Counties Championship cricket for Hertfordshire. He served Langleybury Cricket Club as captain, groundsman, committee member and president.

Career statistics

References

1943 births
2018 deaths
English footballers
Gillingham F.C. players
Luton Town F.C. players
Charlton Athletic F.C. players
Leyton Orient F.C. players
Northampton Town F.C. players
Brentford F.C. players
Wealdstone F.C. players
Southern Football League players
Association football midfielders
Association football defenders
English Football League players
English cricketers
Herefordshire cricketers
People from Three Rivers District